"Just Like the Weather" is a song co-written and recorded by American country music artist Suzy Bogguss.  It was released in July 1993 as the first single from her album Something Up My Sleeve.  The song reached number 5 on the Billboard Hot Country Singles & Tracks chart in November 1993.  It was written by Bogguss and Doug Crider.

Chart performance

Year-end charts

References

1993 singles
1993 songs
Suzy Bogguss songs
Song recordings produced by Jimmy Bowen
Liberty Records singles